Chip is an English given name and nickname in the United States, which is often a diminutive form of Charles or Christopher. Notable people referred to by this name include the following:

People

Nickname 

 Raymond Chip Ambres (born 1979), American baseball player
 Willis Chip Arndt (born 1966), American gay activist and reality show winner
 Charles Chip Babcock (born 1949), American attorney
 William Chip Banks (born 1959), American football player
 Charles Chip Beall (born 1948), American television host
 Charles Chip Beck (born 1956), American golfer
 John Chip Berlet (born 1949), American investigative journalist and photojournalist
 Charles E. Bohlen (1904–1974), American diplomat
 Arthur Chip Bok (born 1952), American editorial cartoonist
 Earl Chip Brian (born 1970), American financial services, information technology, and construction entrepreneur
 Harry Chip Caray (born 1965), American sports announcer
 James "Chip" Carter, son of former US President Jimmy Carter
 Frank Chip Cipolla (1926–1994), American sports announcer
 Thomas Chip Coulter (born 1945), American baseball player
 Raymond Chip Cravaack (born 1959), American politician and former US Navy pilot
 Rudolph Chip Damiani (1945–2014), American drummer
 Louis Chip Davis (born 1947), American musician and composer
 John Chip Dicks (born 1951), American politician and lobbyist
 Robert Chip Dunham, American cartoonist
 Arthur Chip Engelland (born 1961), American basketball player and coach
 Charles Esten (born 1965), American comedian, actor and singer
 Laverne Chip Fields (born 1951), American singer, actress and television director
 Francis Chip Flaherty, American film producer, publisher, and executive at SkyPath Media
 Floyd Chip Ganassi (born 1958), American former racecar driver and current racecar owner
 David Chip Glass (born 1971), American baseball player
 Charles Chip Goodyear (born 1958), American businessman and member of the Goodyear family
 C. W. Grafton (1909–1982), American crime novelist
 Walter Chip Hale (born 1964), American baseball player and coach
 Lee Chip Hanauer (born 1954), American motorboat racer
 Len "Chip" Hawkes, bassist in The Tremeloes and father of Chesney Hawkes
 William Chip Healy (1947–2019), American football player
 Ralph Chip Ingram (born 1954), Christian pastor, author, and orator
 Charles Chip Jett (born 1974), American professional poker player
 George Chip Johannessen, American TV producer, writer and editor
 Charles Chip Kelly (born 1963), American football coach
 Charles Chip Kidd (born 1964), American graphic designer, author and editor
 John Chip Lohmiller (born 1966), American football player
 Alfred C. Marble Jr. (1936–2017), American Episcopal bishop
 Edward Chip Monck (born 1939), American lighting designer and master of ceremonies at the 1969 Woodstock Festival
 Charles Chip Mosher (1947-2021), American columnist, novelist, actor
 Phillip Chip Myers (1945–1999), American football player
 Charles Chip Pashayan (born 1941), American politician
 Charles Chip Peterson (born 1987), American long-distance swimmer
 Charles Chip Pickering (born 1963), American politician
 David Chip Reese (1951–2007), American poker player
 L. W. Robert Jr. (1889–1976), college athlete, engineer and government official
 William Chip Rogers (born 1968), American former politician
 Dale Chip Rosenbloom (born 1964), American filmmaker, director and producer, co-owner and Vice Chairman of the St. Louis Rams football franchise
 Charles Chip Roy (born 1972), American politician
 Joseph Chip Skowron, American financier and convicted fraudster
 Jerome Chip Zien (born 1947), American stage and television actor

Given name 

 Chip Bailey (1921–1963), New Zealand communist, taxi driver and trade unionist
 Chip Baltimore (born 1966), member of the Iowa House of Representatives
 Chip Bell, author, keynote speaker, and consultant
 Chip Bolcik (born 1958), American voice-over announcer and narrator
 Chip Chalmers, theater and television director
 Chip Chinery (born 1964), American comedian and actor
 Chip Coffey (born 1954), American self-proclaimed psychic
 Chip Conley (born 1960), American hotelier, hospitality entrepreneur, author, and speaker
 Chip Cox (born 1983), Canadian football linebacker
 Chip Deffaa, American author, jazz historian, playwright, songwriter, and director
 Chip Duncan (born 1955), American filmmaker, author, and photographer
 Chip Ferguson, former American football quarterback
 Chip Foose (born 1963), American automobile designer
 Chip Forrester, former chairman of the Tennessee Democratic Party
 Chip Foster, one half of Chip and Pepper
 Chip Franklin (born 1957), talk show host, writer, producer, comedian, and musician
 Chip Giller, American journalist and environmentalist
 Chip Gubera (born 1975), American film director and producer
 Chip Hall (born 1973), American television producer and writer
 Chip Hanna (born 1965), drummer of U.S. Bombs and One Man Army
 Chip Hayes (born 1956), American soap opera writer, producer and director
 Chip Heath, American bestselling author and speaker
 Chip Hines, Roman Catholic priest who co-hosts the CatholicTV program Spotlight
 Chip Hooper (born 1958), former tennis player
 Chip Hourihan, American film producer and director
 Chip Huggins (born 1961), Republican member of the South Carolina House of Representatives
 Chip Jackson, American jazz double bass player

Fictional characters 

 Chip 'n' Dale, the Disney cartoon chipmunks
 Chip, from the children's TV series Barney & Friends
 Chip, one of the two dung beetles in Camp Lazlo
 Chip, a main character from the children's show Chip and Potato
 Chip (Flaked), the main character of the comedy series Flaked
 Chip Carson/C-17, the protagonist of the Not Quite Human film trilogy and novels
 Chip (Power Rangers), a character in Power Rangers: Mystic Force
 Chip, from the Sega video game Sonic Unleashed
 Chip Chase, in the cartoon The Transformers
 Chip Crosswire, in the animated TV show Arthur
 Richard "Chip" Douglas, one of My Three Sons in the American TV show
 Chip Flagston, son of the titular characters in the comic strip Hi and Lois
 Chip, a male wasp in the 1998 DreamWorks Animation animated film Antz
 Chip Hazard, the toy antagonist in Small Soldiers
 Chip Hilton, the central character in a series of 24 sports novels
 Charles "Chip" Lowell, on the sitcom Kate & Allie
 Chip Martin, the Schizoid Man in comic books published by Marvel Comics
 Chip Medford, in the 1994 TV movie Revenge of the Nerds IV: Nerds in Love
 Chip Potato, from the British animated short series Small Potatoes
 Chip Potts, in the Disney film Beauty and the Beast and other media
 Chip Skylark, from the animated TV show The Fairly OddParents
 Chip Robinson, in The Magic Key (Oxford Reading Tree) book series and TV adaptation

See also 

 Chips (nickname)
 Chippy (nickname)
 Chipper (nickname)

References

English masculine given names
Hypocorisms
Lists of people by nickname